Neuville-Vitasse is a commune in the Pas-de-Calais department in the Hauts-de-France region of France.

Geography

Population

Places of interest
 The church of St.Martin, rebuilt after World War I.
 The Commonwealth War Graves Commission cemeteries: 
 -The London cemetery where are buried 713 british soldiers and 23 canadian soldiers who fought the german army on the front line from 1917 to 1918. The London cemetery is located de Beaurains path. 
 -The Neuville-Vitasse road cemetery where 80 french soldiers were buried, is located on Saint Martin path.
 -Two war memorials.

See also
Communes of the Pas-de-Calais department

References

External links

 London CWGC cemetery at Neuville-Vitasse
 The CWGC cemetery of Neuville-Vitasse Road

Neuvillevitasse